Taron may refer to:

People
Taron Egerton (born 1989), British actor
Taron Johnson (born 1996), American football player
Taron Margaryan (born 1978), Armenian politician and Mayor of Yerevan
Taron Voskanyan (born 1993), Armenian football player

of Taron
Khachatur of Taron, was an Armenian poet, musician and religious figure
Grigor I of Taron, ruler of the southern Armenian region of Taron

Other uses
Taron (gastropod), a genus of gastropods in the family Fasciolariidae
Taron (historic Armenia), historic province of Armenia
Taron (roller coaster), at Phantasialand, Germany
Taron people, an ethnic group in Burma
Mount Taron (2,379m), the highest point in the Hans Meyer Range on the island of New Ireland in Papua New Guinea